Bresnahan is a surname. Notable people with the surname include:

Chuck Bresnahan (born 1960), American football coach
Patrick Francis Bresnahan (1872–1940), U.S. Navy sailor
Roger Bresnahan (1879–1944), American baseball player
Tom Bresnahan, American football player
Timothy Bresnahan (born 1953), American economist

See also
Mount Bresnahan, a mountain of Antarctica